

Events
Gaia, pastorela, a pastorela by Guiraut Riquier, composed

Births

Deaths
 Gonzalo de Berceo (born 1190), Spanish poet especially on religious themes

13th-century poetry
Poetry